Digiryzm Mutation is the second album released by the Japanese pop rock trio Iceman on May 21, 1998.

Track listing

Personnel 

Daisuke Asakura – keyboards 
Kenichi Ito – guitar
Michihiro Kuroda – lead vocals

References
Iceman/DA Family fansite
Album Artwork

1998 albums
Iceman (Japanese band) albums